Nishtar Hall is a cultural centre and music venue in Peshawar, Pakistan. It was established to promote and represent the Pashtun culture and music. Hall was established in 1985. It is an only and large entertainment venue in Peshawar with a capacity of 600 people. It remained closed for eight years and opened again in 2000s.

History 
Hall was established in 1985 to promote culture of Khyber Pakhtunkhwa. It was named after a Pashtun freedom fighter Sardar Abdur Rab Nishtar. In start it was organised by the Abasin Arts Council and later by Cultural Department of Khyber Pakhtunkhwa.

References 

Music venues in Pakistan
Folk music venues
Performing arts centres
Theatres in Pakistan
Buildings and structures in Peshawar
Music venues completed in 1985
1985 establishments in Pakistan